François André (19 July 1967 – 11 February 2020) was a French politician representing the Socialist Party. He was re-elected to the French National Assembly on 18 June 2017, representing the department of Ille-et-Vilaine.

He was first elected as a councilor for Rennes as part of the PS in 2001. In 2008, André was elected as the head of the Canton of Rennes-Nord-Ouest. He decided not to vote for the PS candidate in the 2017 French presidential election, Benoît Hamon, in the first round, and instead voted for Emmanuel Macron, the candidate for En Marche! He died from lung cancer on 11 February 2020, aged 52.

See also
 2017 French legislative election

References

1967 births
2020 deaths
Deputies of the 14th National Assembly of the French Fifth Republic
Deputies of the 15th National Assembly of the French Fifth Republic
Socialist Party (France) politicians
Deaths from lung cancer in France
People from Pontivy
Politicians from Brittany
Members of Parliament for Ille-et-Vilaine